Noturus insignis (margined madtom) is a small species of North American catfish belonging to the family Ictaluridae.

Description 
The margined madtom is yellow to dark gray on the upper side of the body, and a pale shade on the underside. It is slimmer than other members of the family Ictaluridae. It has a square tail and lacks the rays of other tadpole madtoms. The dorsal fin and anal fins are rounded, the chin barbels are pale, and all the other barbels are dark. They are sized from about 10 cm to 13 cm.

Distribution and habitat 
The species ranges from Lake Ontario drainages southward to Georgia. Margined madtoms inhabit clear-water streams, taking shelter among rocks, gravel, and boulders. Its eggs are laid in large quantities, and are guarded by the male parent.

References 

 Smith, L. C. The Inland Fishes of New York State. New York: The New York State Department of Environmental Conservation. 1985, pp. 88.
 Florida Museum of Natural History entry

Noturus
Freshwater fish of the United States
Fish of the Eastern United States
Fish of the Great Lakes
Fauna of the Northeastern United States
Fauna of the Southeastern United States
Fish described in 1836